Kemp is a city in Kaufman County, Texas, United States. The population was 1,129 in 2020.

History 
The community was named for Sara Kemp, mother of Levi Noble, the first postmaster, and was officially established when the post office opened in 1851. It grew slowly during its first thirty years. A Presbyterian congregation was organized in 1854, and the Kemp Academy of Learning began operation in 1867. After the Civil War an increasing number of settlers moved to the community. In 1870 Dr. A. J. Still, hoping to profit from this growth and the possible construction of a railroad through the area, bought land just north of the community (where the current city sits) and, after surveying, dividing the tract into lots, and platting it, persuaded the directors of the Southern Pacific Railroad to lay tracks across his property by offering the company a number of lots. Another early settler, Sam Parmalee, followed suit and offered the rail company right-of-way through his property. The mid-1880s witnessed the completion of the rail line through the community, the construction of a depot there, and the designation of Kemp as a terminus on the line.

The railroad attracted settlers to Kemp. Prospering with the surrounding cattle ranches and cotton farms, the community developed as a trade center for the lower part of the county. By the early twentieth century the population had reached 513, and the Methodist and Baptist congregations had established churches. Kemp also supported a local newspaper, the Kemp News. The paper was owned and edited by Mike S. Boggess. In 1926 the town had a population of 1,200, sixty businesses, and two banks. By 1936, 46 businesses operated in Kemp. The population declined from 1,000 to 816 between the end of World War II and the mid-1960s. Businesses declined from 41 to 33. In 1965 Cedar Creek Reservoir was completed just south of the community. Kemp had a population of 1,184 and 75 businesses in 1990. Much of the land around town was still devoted to cattle production, and many residents commuted to jobs in the Dallas area. In 2000 the population was 1,133.

During the summer of 2011, the city received national attention due to its aging water utility system and complications resulting from the severe Texas drought of 2011.

Geography

Kemp is located in southeastern Kaufman County. U.S. Route 175 runs along the northeast side of the city, leading northwest  to Kaufman, the county seat, and southeast  to Athens.

It is at the north end of Cedar Creek Lake.

Demographics

As of the 2020 United States census, there were 1,129 people, 368 households, and 232 families residing in the city.

Government 
The city of Kemp is a Type A general law municipality with a mayor-council form of government. The mayor is the chief executive officer of the city and oversees the day-to-day operations of the city government. The mayor is elected at-large and serves a two-year term. The city council consists of five members and the mayor. Council members are elected at-large by place, and serve for two-year terms. The mayor is the presiding officer of the city council. One council member is elected annually by the other members to serve as Mayor Pro-Tem in the absence of the mayor.

The city operates a public works department including water and wastewater utilities, and the Kemp Municipal Court. The city employs a city secretary, a small administrative staff, a municipal judge/court clerk, a public works director, a small public works staff, a chief of police, a police sergeant/K9 unit, and several full-time and reserve officers. On May 9, 2012, the city council voted to disband the Kemp Police Department in favor of outsourcing to the Kaufman County Sheriff due to budget constraints. It was subsequently restored. The chief is being sued for civil rights violations. The lawsuit is on hold, while minor criminal charges against the plaintiff remain pending.

The city has chartered the Kemp Housing Authority, which operates two public housing apartment campuses, and is governed by a board of commissioners appointed by the mayor. It employs an executive director, a clerical assistant and a small maintenance staff.

The city has chartered the Kemp Economic Development Corporation, a type 4B EDC. It is funded by a $.005 sales tax for economic development purposes. The Kemp EDC has a board of directors appointed by the Kemp City Council.

The city is served by the Kemp Municipal Development District, which includes the city of Kemp and its extraterritorial jurisdiction. The Kemp MDD was created by election in May 2010 and began operations October 1, 2010. The district levies a $.0025 sales tax for economic and municipal development purposes. The Kemp City Council serves as the Kemp Municipal Development District board of directors.

Education 
The city is served by the Kemp Independent School District and the Trinity Valley Community College District.

References

Bibliography
 Robert Richard Butler, History of Kaufman County, Texas (M.A. thesis, University of Texas, 1940).
 Kaufman County Historical Commission, History of Kaufman County (Dallas: Taylor, 1978).

External links
Official website

Dallas–Fort Worth metroplex
Cities in Kaufman County, Texas
Cities in Texas
Populated places established in 1922